is a Japanese footballer who plays for FC Imabari, as a defender.

Career

FC Imabari
On 16 December 2018, FC Imabari announced the signing of Sonoda.

Career statistics
Updated to 23 December 2018.

References

External links
Profile at Roasso Kumamoto

1984 births
Living people
Chuo University alumni
Association football people from Miyazaki Prefecture
Japanese footballers
J1 League players
J2 League players
Japan Football League players
Montedio Yamagata players
Ehime FC players
Roasso Kumamoto players
FC Imabari players
Association football defenders